Pedro Brancia Yeto (March 3, 1917 - March 1, 2004) was a lieutenant assigned to the U.S. Signal Corps during World War II. He had set up a wireless radio relay station on this island which lies at 
 between Guimaras Island and Guiuanon Island on the Province of Panay in the Republic of the Philippines. The natives called it "isla ni Yeto" referring to the place being used by the soldiers fighting  against the Japanese invaders at that time and under the command of Lt. P. B. Yeto. It served the purpose of relaying messages to American submarines nearby for rescuing downed American pilots.

After the war, P. B. Yeto went on to become a marine engineer in the Philippines and passed the board exams with a 100% passing grade. Later on he reached the peak of his career, becoming a board examiner for the Engine Officers in the Philippine Regulation Commission.

The island which was in the United States Army Map Services of 1941 was last published in 1954.

Further research about Spanish Era maps came up with no name for the island during Spanish colonization of the Philippines.

References

Islands of Guimaras